Koi are ornamental domesticated fish, commonly kept for decorative purposes in an outdoor pond.

Koi may also refer to:

People

 Koi, a Japanese comic book artist, author of Is the Order a Rabbit?
 Furuichi Kōi (古市公威; 1854–1934), a civil engineer and president of Kōka Daigaku, the present college of engineering of Tokyo University
 Koi Ikeno (born 1959), Japanese manga author and illustrator
 Gyula Koi (born 1977), Hungarian legal scholar and lecturer
 Koi Larbi, Ghanaian barrister and judge
 Koi Sie Yan (born 1999), Malaysian rhythmic gymnast
 Koi Turnbull (born 1976), American comic book artist

Media
 Koi (magazine), a British journal on the hobby of keeping Koi
 "Koi" (song), a single by Gen Hoshino

Other uses
 Gangetic koi or anabas cobojius, fish species native to Bangladesh and India
 Koi, California, a Native American settlement in Lake County, California
 Koi language
 koi, the ISO 639-3 identifier for the Komi-Permyak language
 Madam Koi Koi, a myth

See also 
 KOI (disambiguation)
 Kois, surname
 Khoi (disambiguation)
 Koy (disambiguation)
 Coi (disambiguation)
 Coy (disambiguation)